Sabz Gezi or Sabz Gazi may refer to:
 Sabz Gezi, Anbarabad
 Sabz Gazi, Rudbar-e Jonubi